Ozero (lit. lake) (full name: дачный потребительский кооператив «Озеро», Dacha consumer cooperative "Ozero")  is a dacha cooperative associated with Vladimir Putin's inner circle.

History
The society united their dachas in Solovyovka, Priozersky District of Leningrad Oblast, on the eastern shore of Lake Komsomolskoye on the Karelian Isthmus, near Saint Petersburg, Russia.  

Vladimir Putin returned from his KGB posting in Dresden in early 1990, prior to the formal establishment of the Ozero cooperative, and acquired property on the banks of Lake Komsomolskoye. His dacha burned down in 1996 but was rebuilt later that year. Others bought more land around this area and built a number of villas close to each other to form a gated community. A bank account linked to this cooperative association was opened, allowing money to be deposited and used by all account holders in accordance with the Russian law on cooperatives.

By 2012 members of the Ozero cooperative had assumed top positions in Russian government and business and became very successful financially.

Ozero members

The table includes alleged net worth or annual compensation

Security
Purportedly the firm Rif-Security provides security for the Ozero Dacha Community.  Rif-Security is controlled by the alleged boss of the Tambov Gang Vladimir Barsukov (Kumarin) and Vladimir Smirnov.

Political effect
Some observers hint that the roots of Putin's power may lie in Ozero camaraderie.

The Ozero cooperative society holds a bank account at the Leningrad Oblast Bank. The financial transactions of the Ozero cooperative are unknown. By law any of the members would be able to deposit and withdraw funds for his own use. Karen Dawisha, director of the Havighurst Center for Russian and Post-Soviet Studies at Miami University, concluded that "in Russia a cooperative arrangement is another way for Putin to avoid being given money directly, while enjoying the wealth shared among co-owners".

Putin. Corruption, an independent report published by the opposition People's Freedom Party, is about the alleged corruption in Vladimir Putin's inner circle and has a chapter about Ozero.

See also
Corruption in Russia
Political groups under Vladimir Putin's presidency
LLCInvest (LLCInvest is often referred to as "digital consumer cooperative Ozero").

Notes

References

Housing cooperatives in Russia
Vladimir Putin
Organizations established in 1996
Corruption in Russia
Wealth in Russia